Dallan is a town and union council of Tehsil Thal Hangu District in Khyber Pakhtunkhwa province of Pakistan.

References

Union councils of Hangu District
Populated places in Hangu District, Pakistan